A by-election for the Australian House of Representatives seat of New England was held on 2 December 2017.

Previous incumbent Barnaby Joyce, serving as Deputy Prime Minister and Nationals leader from February 2016 until October 2017 when his seat of New England was declared vacant, won the by-election with a large primary and two-party swing.

Background
Amid the 2017–18 Australian parliamentary eligibility crisis, the trigger for the by-election was the judgment of the High Court of Australia sitting as the Court of Disputed Returns on 27 October 2017, which found that the sitting member, Deputy Prime Minister and Nationals leader Barnaby Joyce, was ineligible under Section 44 of the Constitution to sit in the Parliament of Australia, by virtue of holding New Zealand citizenship at the time of his nomination and election. The seat was declared vacant by the High Court on the same day. Joyce had renounced his dual citizenship effective from August in order to become a sole citizen of Australia, and was thus eligible to run for the by-election.

Speaker of the House of Representatives Tony Smith issued the writ for the election on 27 October 2017, the same day as the High Court's judgment.

Key dates
 Friday 27 October 2017 – Previous election ruled void
 Friday 27 October 2017 – Issue of writ
 Friday 3 November 2017 – Close of electoral rolls (8pm)
 Thursday 9 November 2017 – Close of nominations (12 noon)
 Friday 10 November 2017 – Declaration of nominations (12 noon)
 Tuesday 14 November 2017 – Start of early voting
 Saturday 2 December 2017 – Polling day (8am to 6pm)
 Friday 15 December 2017 – Last day for receipt of postal votes
 Sunday 4 February 2018 – Last day for return of writ

As at least 33 days must elapse between the issue of a writ and the date of a by-election, the earliest Saturday that the by-election could take place was on 2 December.

Candidates
Former independent member for New England Tony Windsor, who retired at the 2013 election before unsuccessfully contesting the seat at the 2016 election with a 29.2 percent primary vote, announced he would not be nominating as a candidate in the by-election. Pauline Hanson's One Nation and Shooters, Fishers and Farmers also announced that they would not run.

Results

Early in the evening, ABC election analyst Antony Green predicted an easy victory for Joyce. Claiming victory that evening, Joyce picked up a large primary and two-party swing.

See also
 List of Australian federal by-elections

References

External links
 2017 New England by-election (Australian Electoral Commission)
 2017 New England by-election (ABC Elections)

New South Wales federal by-elections
2017 elections in Australia